Puhoi may refer to:

 Puhoi, New Zealand, a settlement in Auckland, New Zealand
 Puhoi, Ialoveni, a village and commune in Ialoveni District, Moldova